Rabbit ears are the ears of a rabbit. Rabbit Ears or Rabbit ears may also refer to:

Places
 Rabbit Ears (Clayton, New Mexico), twin mountain peaks that are a National Historic Landmark
 Rabbit Ears Pass in Colorado
 Rabbit Ears Range in the Rocky Mountains in Colorado

Arts, entertainment, and media
 Rabbit Ears Productions, an animation company for children's stories
 RabbitEars, a website dedicated to over-the-air digital television in the United States
 Rabbit Ears, an episode of the American animated sitcom American Dad!.

Science and technology
 Rabbit ears, a colloquial term for a set-top tv antenna
 Rabbit ears, a vernacular name for the bunny ears cactus, Opuntia microdasys
 Rabbit ears, a  vernacular name for the fungus Wynnea americana

See also
 Bunny ears (disambiguation)